"Weekends and Bleak Days (Hot Summer)" is a song by English indie rock band Young Knives and is featured on their second studio album, Voices of Animals and Men. The fourth single taken from the album, it was released on 14 August 2006 and reached a peak position of #35 in the UK Singles Chart.

2006 singles
2006 songs
Transgressive Records singles